Eğerci  (also called Eyerci) is a belde (town) in Devrek district of Zonguldak Province, Turkey. The population of Eğerci is 1510  as of 2011. The settlement was a stop in caravan routes during the Ottoman era and it was named after saddle makers. In 1986, it was declared a seat of township. A textile factory and forestry are the main sources of revenue for the town. Tourism (camping and hunting) is also promising.

References

Populated places in Zonguldak Province
Populated places in Devrek District
Towns in Turkey